Smallwood is an American architectural firm based in Atlanta, Georgia. Established in 1979, the company has approximately 108 total employees across all of its locations and generates $25.00 million in sales (USD). There are 3 companies in the Smallwood, Reynolds, Stewart, Stewart & Associates, Inc. corporate family; with the Atlanta office primarily serving the Southeastern United States and an additional office in Singapore. Its Atlanta office is headed by eleven principal architects, many of whom are members of the American Institute of Architects (AIA) and are Leadership in Energy and Environmental Design (LEED) Certified Professionals. The firm has worked on designs in corporate, commercial, hospitality, multifamily, industrial, governmental, and educational settings.

Notable Projects

3344 Peachtree, Atlanta, 2006 
Truist Center, Charlotte, North Carolina 2002 
1100 Peachtree, Atlanta, 1990 
Resurgens Plaza, Atlanta, 1988 
RBC Gateway, Minneapolis, 2021 
Atlanta Financial Center, Atlanta, 1982 
Lincoln Financial Building, Greensboro, North Carolina, 1990 
Fifth Third Center, Charlotte, North Carolina, 1997  
Frisco Station, Texas, Frisco, Texas, 2019 

TWELVE Centennial Park, Atlanta, 2007 
Avenue, Charlotte, 2007 
The Atlantic
Capital Plaza, Abu Dhabi, UAE, 2011 
Signature Tower Jakarta, Jakarta, 2021 
Icon Buckhead, Atlanta, 2019 
Cay Building, Savannah, 2012

Recognition
 Ranked 26 in the 2019 Interior Design Magazine 100 Rising Giants 
 Ranked 83 in the 2021 Interior Design Magazine Top 100 Giants 
 Ranked 439 in 2020 ENR  Top 500 Design Firms 
 Ranked 76 in 2020 ENR Top 100 Green Design Firms  
 2020 ENR Top 500 Sourcebook   
 Ranked 18 – Top 20 Design Firms for Hotels, Motels, and Convention Centers
 Ranked 17 – Top 20 Design Firms for Mixed-Use Developments
 Ranked 7 in Atlanta Business Chronicle Top 25 Architectural Design Firms 2019 
 Ranked 6 in Atlanta Business Chronicle Top 25 Interior Design Firms 2019 
 Ranked 58 in 2020 Building Design + Construction Giants Top 155 Architecture Firms

References

External links
Smallwood Firm Profile
Smallwood Homepage
Emporis

Architecture firms based in Georgia (U.S. state)
1979 establishments in Georgia (U.S. state)
Design companies established in 1979
Companies based in Atlanta